Rohle is a municipality and village in Šumperk District in the Olomouc Region of the Czech Republic. It has about 600 inhabitants.

Administrative parts
Villages of Janoslavice and Nedvězí are administrative parts of Rohle.

History
The first written mention of Rohle is from 1344. In 1976, the municipalities of Janoslavice and Nedvězí were merged with Rohle.

References

Villages in Šumperk District